Hunger and Hardship Creek is a stream in the U.S. state of Georgia.  It is a tributary to the Oconee River.

Hunger and Hardship Creek most likely was named from an incident of hunger and hardship by a pioneer surveyor.

References

Rivers of Georgia (U.S. state)
Rivers of Laurens County, Georgia